Actinomyia is a genus of flies in the family Stratiomyidae.

Species
Actinomyia eupodata (Bigot, 1879)
Actinomyia longicornis (Schiner, 1868)
Actinomyia novaeteutoniae Lindner, 1949

References

Stratiomyidae
Brachycera genera
Taxa named by Erwin Lindner
Diptera of South America